Autorità per le Garanzie nelle Comunicazioni (AGCOM) is the regulator and competition authority for the communication industries in Italy.

Administrative leadership
The 4 members of Agcom board are elected by the Parliament (2 by the Senate, 2 by the Chamber of Deputies) and consequently the Parliament establish its powers and define its statutes.

Responsibilities
The Authority carries out regulatory and supervisory functions in the areas of telecommunications, television, newspapers and postal services. Functional branch of the authority are the Regional Committees for Communications (Corecom).

See also
List of telecommunications regulatory bodies

External links
 
 Report of the Special Rapporteur on the promotion and protection of the right to freedom of opinion and expression, Frank La Rue, on his mission to Italy (11-18 November 2013) by United Nations
 Giornali gratis su Agcom

Government agencies established in 1997
Regulation in Italy
Television in Italy
Communications authorities
Communications in Italy
Mass media complaints authorities
Consumer organisations in Italy